57868 Pupin, provisional designation , is a dark Erigonian asteroid and slow rotator from the inner regions of the asteroid belt, approximately 3.5 kilometers in diameter. It was discovered on December 17, 2001, by astronomers of Near-Earth Asteroid Tracking (NEAT) at the Palomar Observatory in California, United States. The asteroid was name after Serbian–American physicist Mihajlo Pupin.

Orbit and classification 

Pupin is a member of the Erigone family, named after 163 Erigone. It orbits the Sun in the inner main-belt at a distance of 1.8–3.0 AU once every 3 years and 8 months (1,342 days). Its orbit has an eccentricity of 0.25 and an inclination of 4° with respect to the ecliptic.

Physical characteristics 

Based on PanSTARRS photometric survey, Pupin is a carbonaceous C-type asteroid, while the Erigone family's overall spectral type is that of a C- and X-type (CX).

Slow rotator 

In September 2015, a first rotational lightcurve of Pupin was obtained by astronomer Vladimir Benishek at Sopot Astronomical Observatory , Serbia, and by American astronomer Frederick Pilcher at his Organ Mesa Observatory  in New Mexico. It showed a rotation period of  hours with a brightness amplitude of 0.93 in magnitude. This makes it a slow rotator, as asteroids of this size typically rotate within less than 20 hours once around their axis.

Diameter and albedo 

According to the survey carried out by the NEOWISE mission of NASA's space-based Wide-field Infrared Survey Explorer, Pupin measures 3.42 and 5.7 kilometers in diameter and its surface has an albedo of 0.045 and 0.09, respectively. However, the Collaborative Asteroid Lightcurve Link assumes a standard albedo for stony asteroids of 0.20, and calculates a diameter of 2.6 kilometers using an absolute magnitude of 15.3.

Naming 

This minor planet was named in honor of Serbian–American physicist and humanitarian, Mihajlo Pupin (1858–1935). He greatly improved long-distance telephone transmission and the sensitivity of X-ray detection, and worked for Serbian emigres. The asteroid's name was suggested by the above-mentioned astronomers Vladimir Benishek and Frederick Pilcher. The official naming citation was published by the Minor Planet Center on 23 March 2016.

References

External links 
 Asteroid Lightcurve Database (LCDB), query form (info )
 Dictionary of Minor Planet Names, Google books
 Asteroids and comets rotation curves, CdR – Observatoire de Genève, Raoul Behrend
 Discovery Circumstances: Numbered Minor Planets (55001)-(60000) – Minor Planet Center
 
 

 

057868
057868
Named minor planets
057868
20011217